Perry Range is a narrow range of mountains, 6 nautical miles (11 km) long, separating the lower ends of Venzke Glacier and Berry Glacier where they enter Getz Ice Shelf, on the coast of Marie Byrd Land. The range was discovered and photographed from aircraft of the U.S. Antarctic Service in December 1940. Named by Advisory Committee on Antarctic Names (US-ACAN) for Lieutenant John E. Perry, CEC, U.S. Navy, Public Works Officer at McMurdo Station, 1968. He commanded the Antarctic Construction Battalion Unit from January 1969 until it was decommissioned in May 1971, when he became project manager for the South Pole Station.

Features
Geographic features include:

 Berry Glacier
 Bleclic Peaks
 Schloredt Nunatak
 Venzke Glacier
 Mount Prince
 Mount Soond

Mountain ranges of Marie Byrd Land